The 2000–01 Drexel Dragons men's basketball team represented Drexel University  during the 2000–01 NCAA Division I men's basketball season. The Dragons, led by 2nd-year head coach Steve Seymour, played their home games at the Daskalakis Athletic Center and were members of the America East Conference (AEC).

The team finished the season 15–12 and finished in 3rd place in the AEC in the regular season.

Roster

Schedule

|-
!colspan=9 style="background:#F8B800; color:#002663;"| Regular season
|-

|-
!colspan=9 style="background:#F5CF47; color:#002663;"| AEC tournament

Awards
Mike Kouser
AEC All-Conference First Team
AEC Player of the Week (2)

Joe Linderman
AEC All-Conference Second Team

Stephen Starks
AEC All-Conference First Team

References

Drexel Dragons men's basketball seasons
Drexel
2000 in sports in Pennsylvania
2001 in sports in Pennsylvania